The 2023 season will be the New England Patriots' upcoming 54th season in the National Football League, their 64th overall, their 22nd playing home games at Gillette Stadium and their 24th under head coach Bill Belichick. They will attempt to improve upon their 8–9 record from last year and return to the playoffs after a one year absence. This will be the first season since 2009 that defensive back Devin McCourty will not be a member of the Patriots, as he announced his retirement on March 10.

Roster changes

Free agency

Unrestricted

Restricted

Signings/waiver claims

Releases/waivers

Trades 
June 16: The Patriots traded tight end Jonnu Smith to the Atlanta Falcons in exchange for a 2023 seventh-round selection (No. 245).

Draft

Staff

Current roster

Preseason
The Patriots' preseason opponents and schedule will be announced in the spring.

Regular season

2023 opponents
Listed below are the Patriots' opponents for 2023. Exact dates and times will be announced in the spring. The Patriots will also host one of their games at either the Allianz Arena in Munich or the Deutsche Bank Park in Frankfurt as part of the NFL International Series.

References

External links
 

New England
New England Patriots seasons
New England Patriots